Mudung Batu Bora or Mudung Bora, located in Plieran, is one of the highest peak in Plieran at 1,450 m (4,757 ft). Mudung Batu Bora lies about 3.7 kilometres north of Plieran river, and can be seen from there on a clear day but most of the time it is covered with the clouds. Mudung Bora, which literally means "cotton hill" in Kenyah, was already identified on the map by the name of Bukit Batu Bora in Malay.

Etymology and history 
Since the interior of the Borneo island was not fully explored in 1940s, the location and name of the hill for the map probably came from the Kenyah community. According to one of the reliable source, Bukit Batu Bora has nothing to do with cotton. The original Kenyah name for the hill was Mudung Batu Borak, meaning "hill that looks like the color of cotton", referring to Kayu Bora., a tree that grew in their village and produce cotton that has same color with the rocks formation in the mountain. However, to the western ear, Borak in Kenyah enunciation sounded like Bora, hence Bukit Batu Bora.

Borneo
Mountains of Sarawak